Florian Kainz (born 24 October 1992) is an Austrian professional footballer who plays as a midfielder for Bundesliga club 1. FC Köln and the Austria national team.

Club career
In July 2014, after more than a decade with Sturm Graz, Graz native Kainz transferred to Rapid Wien for an undisclosed fee. He signed for Rapid until summer 2017.

In June 2016, Kainz joined Werder Bremen on a four-year contract, for a reported €3.5 million transfer fee. On 18 March 2017, he scored his first goal for the club in a 3–0 win against Leipzig. Having been introduced as a substitute in the 88th minute he found the net two minutes later in a match that saw all three of Werder Bremen's Austrian players score in the club's highest win of the season. Two matches later he assisted the last goal in Werder Bremen’s 5–2 win away to Freiburg via free kick, after being brought onto the pitch in the 76th minute.

In the first match of the 2018–19 season, a 6–1 win against Wormatia Worms in the first round of the DFB-Pokal, Kainz assisted the first goal and scored the second in a "Man of the Match" performance.

In January 2019, Kainz joined 1. FC Köln on a three-and-a-half-year deal. The transfer fee paid to Werder Bremen was reported as €3 million.

International career
Kainz made his debut for the senior Austria squad when he came on as a substitute in a friendly against Switzerland in November 2015.

Career statistics

Club

International

References

External links
 
 

1992 births
Living people
Footballers from Graz
Association football midfielders
Austrian footballers
Austria international footballers
Austrian Football Bundesliga players
Bundesliga players
2. Bundesliga players
SK Sturm Graz players
SK Rapid Wien players
SV Werder Bremen players
1. FC Köln players
Austria youth international footballers
Austria under-21 international footballers
Austrian expatriate footballers
Austrian expatriate sportspeople in Germany
Expatriate footballers in Germany